Are You Alone? is the fourth and final studio album from Canadian pop duo Majical Cloudz, released on October 16, 2015, on Matador Records.

The album was nominated for a Juno Award in 2016.

Critical reception

Are You Alone? received largely positive reviews from contemporary music critics. At Metacritic, which assigns a normalized rating out of 100 to reviews from mainstream critics, the album received an average score of 80, based on 18 reviews, which indicates "generally favorable reviews".

Mike Powell of Pitchfork gave the album a positive review, stating, "Like Impersonator, Alone is a sad album, but its sadness is a kind of tall tale, the details of which are overblown for dramatic effect. At times its lyrics sound less like expressions of personal darkness than advertisements for darkness in general, written in lettering so big you could read it from the highway." Powell continues, "Alone is less stripped-down than Impersonator, but it feels less confrontational, too. The band recently went on tour opening for Lorde, and seem to have figured out how to broaden their sound while softening it at the same time, all without losing the detonating high that made Impersonator so remarkable. Songs like "So Blue" and "Downtown"—both standouts—are easy to imagine as more fully fleshed out pieces of music, conveying size without occupying space. Like photographic negatives, you can still see the image but the inversion of blacks and whites lends it a kind of alien melancholy."

Ben Kopel of Flood Magazine wrote of the album: "With this, their sophomore LP about the shaky realities surrounding real love, the co-conspirators have delivered one of 2015’s most honest and moving albums. Lyrically, Welsh explores the doubts and fears that crawl in anytime we open our hearts and lives to anyone—be they family, friend, or partner—with a vulnerability that’s completely comfortable with sounding courageous and unsure in the same baritone breath."

Accolades

Track listing

Personnel
Main personnel
 Devon Welsh – composer
 Matthew Otto – composer, mixing
 Fady Hanna - keyboards, synths
 Owen Pallett – cello, drums, violin (4)
 Austin Milne – saxophone (1)
 Kenneth Welsh – flute (5, 7)

Additional personnel
 Tyler Crawford – mixing
 Tyler Fitzmaurice – mixing
 Ryan Morey – mastering

References

2015 albums
Matador Records albums
Majical Cloudz albums